Superman: The Dark Side is the title of three-issue comic book limited series. It was published in 1998 by DC Comics as an Elseworlds title, an imprint for stories which deviate from the established continuity. The story reinterprets the Superman story, imagining what would have happened had he landed on Apokolips instead of Earth.

Publication history
Superman: The Dark Side was originally published as a standard format comic book from August to October 1998. It was subsequently republished in a trade paperback edition in 1999. The series was written by John Francis Moore with pencils by Kieron Dwyer and inks by Hilary Barta.

Plot
Kal-El's rocket is diverted from Earth to Apokolips, and Superman is raised by Darkseid. Superman becomes an eager participant in the destruction of New Genesis and a willing disciple of Darkseid. Ultimately, he discovers his true origin and leads the New Gods into battle against Darkseid, freeing Apokolips.

In this series, he wears black and red armor similar to that of Darkseid's son Orion. This armor has a unique Superman logo on it. It is two thunder bolt-shaped S's that form another thunder bolt-shaped S (reminiscent of the logo of the Schutzstaffel aka the SS).

See also
Alternative versions of Superman
List of Elseworlds publications

References

Elseworlds titles
Superman titles
Fourth World (comics)